Kanuck may refer to:
 Canuck, slang term for Canadians
 Kanuck, California, former name of Cleone, California